These are the lists of the General Top 100 songs of 2017 in Mexico according to Monitor Latino. Monitor Latino issued two year-end General charts: one which ranked the songs by their number of Spins (Tocadas) on the Mexican radio, and the other ranked the songs by their estimated audience. Monitor Latino also issued separate year-end charts for Regional Mexican, Pop and Anglo songs.

Spins

Audience

See also
List of number-one songs of 2017 (Mexico)
List of number-one albums of 2017 (Mexico)

References

2017 in Mexican music
Mexico Top 100
Mexican record charts